The , with a length of , is the second longest river in the Tōhoku region of Japan and the 6th longest river in Japan. It runs through Fukushima Prefecture and Miyagi Prefecture, rising from springs in the peaks of the Nasu mountains, collecting water from tributaries leaving the Ōu Mountains and the Abukuma Highlands, then emptying into the Pacific Ocean as a major river. It has a 5,390 km² area watershed, and about 1.2 million people live along its basin.

The Abukuma River flows north through Fukushima Prefecture's Nakadōri region, past the cities of Shirakawa, Sukagawa, Kōriyama, Nihonmatsu, Date, and Fukushima. The portion of the river flowing between Nihonmatsu and Fukushima forms a deep ravine called Hōrai-kyō. Crossing the northern edge of the long but low Abukuma hills, the Abukuma River then flows into Miyagi Prefecture, past the city of Kakuda and between Iwanuma and Watari before reaching the Pacific. Abukuma has a tributary called the Arakawa River.

Notes

References 

 

Rivers of Fukushima Prefecture
Rivers of Miyagi Prefecture
Marumori, Miyagi
Kakuda, Miyagi
Shibata, Miyagi
Watari, Miyagi
Iwanuma, Miyagi
Rivers of Japan